Bai Yan is the name of:

 Bai Yan (actor) (1920–2019), Singaporean actor
 Bai Yan (tennis) (born 1989), Chinese tennis player

See also
 Bai Yang (disambiguation)